Finnøya is an island in Hamarøy Municipality in Nordland county, Norway. The island is situated northwest of the village of Innhavet with which it is connected by bridge. In 2016, the island of Finnøya had a population of 75.

Sagfjord Church is located on the south side of the island in the village of Karlsøy.

References

Hamarøy
Islands of Nordland
Populated places of Arctic Norway